Sonnet 142 is one of 154 sonnets written by the English playwright and poet William Shakespeare.

Structure 
Sonnet 142 is an English or Shakespearean sonnet. The English sonnet has three quatrains, followed by a final rhyming couplet. It follows the typical rhyme scheme of the form ABAB CDCD EFEF GG and is composed in iambic pentameter, a type of poetic metre based on five pairs of metrically weak/strong syllabic positions. The 14th line exemplifies a regular iambic pentameter:

 ×  /   × /  ×   /      ×   /  × / 
By self-example mayst thou be denied! (142.14)

The 2nd line contains three common metrical variants: an initial reversal, a mid-line reversal, and a final extrametrical syllable or feminine ending:

 /   ×   ×  /     /   ×  ×   /  ×   /(×) 
Hate of my sin, grounded on sinful loving: (142.2)
/ = ictus, a metrically strong syllabic position. × = nonictus. (×) = extrametrical syllable.

Line 4 necessarily shares a feminine ending. An initial reversal can also be found in line 1, and potentially in lines 3, 5, 8, and 12; another mid-line reversal can be found in line 5.

The meter demands two variant (and unusual to modern ears) pronunciations: line 8's "revenues" is stressed on the second syllable, and line 9's "Be it" functions as one syllable.

While frequently the rhythm of iambic pentameter lines arises from the implicit emphasis of its words, this sonnet affords several examples of the implicit emphasis of words arising from the meter. For example, in line 9, Shakespeare diverts the ictus away from the two strong tonic stresses of "love" and "lov'st" by arranging the line such that the meter implies contrastive accent on the four pronouns surrounding them:

 ×     /  ×  /  ×     /   ×    /   ×       / 
Be it lawful I love thee, as thou lov'st those (142.9)

Interpretations
Sylvia Syms, for the 2002 compilation album, When Love Speaks (EMI)

Notes

References

External links
Shakespeare sonnets.com

British poems
Sonnets by William Shakespeare